The following movable bridges (drawbridges and swing bridges) exist in the U.S. state of Florida.

Atlantic Intracoastal Waterway and tributaries
Bridge of Lions, SR A1A over Matanzas River (AIWW), St. Augustine
Crescent Beach Bridge, SR 206 over Matanzas River (AIWW), Crescent Beach
Knox Memorial Bridge, CR 2002 over Halifax River (AIWW), Mound Grove
Main Street Bridge, CR 4040 over Halifax River (AIWW), Daytona Beach
North Causeway, SR 44 over Indian River (AIWW), New Smyrna Beach
Haulover Canal Bridge, Courtenay Parkway over Haulover Canal (AIWW), Kennedy Space Center

NASA Causeway, NASA Parkway over Indian River (AIWW), Kennedy Space Center
Christa McAuliffe Bridge, SR 3 over Canaveral Barge Canal, Merritt Island
State Road 401 Bridge, SR 401 over Canaveral Barge Canal, Port Canaveral
Mathers Bridge, CR 3 over Banana River, Indian Harbour Beach
North Causeway, SR A1A over Indian River (AIWW), Fort Pierce
Hobe Sound Bridge, CR 707 over Indian River (AIWW), Hobe Sound
Jupiter Island Bridge, CR 707 over Jupiter Sound (AIWW), Jupiter Inlet Colony
Jupiter Federal Bridge, US 1 over Jupiter Inlet (AIWW), Jupiter
Indiantown Road Bridge, SR 706 over Lake Worth Creek (AIWW), Jupiter
Donald Ross Bridge, Donald Ross Road over Lake Worth Creek (AIWW), Juno Beach
PGA Boulevard Bridge, SR 786 over Lake Worth Creek (AIWW), Palm Beach Gardens
Parker Bridge, US 1 over Lake Worth Creek (AIWW), North Palm Beach
Flagler Memorial Bridge, SR A1A over Lake Worth (AIWW), West Palm Beach-Palm Beach
Royal Park Bridge, SR 704 over Lake Worth (AIWW), West Palm Beach-Palm Beach
Southern Boulevard Bridge, US 98 / SR 80 over Lake Worth (AIWW), West Palm Beach-Palm Beach
Lake Avenue Bridge, SR 802 over Lake Worth (AIWW), Lake Worth
Lantana Bridge, CR 812 (Ocean Avenue) over Lake Worth (AIWW), Lantana
Ocean Avenue Bridge, SR 804 over AIWW, Boynton Beach-Ocean Ridge
Woolbright Road Bridge, CR 792 over AIWW, Boynton Beach-Ocean Ridge
Northeast 8th Street Bridge, CR 806A over AIWW, Delray Beach
Atlantic Avenue Bridge, SR 806 over AIWW, Delray Beach
Linton Boulevard Bridge, CR 782 over AIWW, Delray Beach
Spanish River Boulevard Bridge, SR 800 over AIWW, Boca Raton
Palmetto Park Road Bridge, CR 798 over AIWW, Boca Raton
Boca Raton Inlet Bridge, SR A1A over Boca Raton Inlet, Boca Raton
Camino Real Bridge, Camino Real over AIWW, Boca Raton
Hillsboro Boulevard Bridge, SR 810 over AIWW, Deerfield Beach
Hillsboro Inlet Bridge, SR A1A over Hillsboro Inlet, Hillsboro Beach-Pompano Beach
14th Street Causeway, SR 844 over AIWW, Pompano Beach
Atlantic Boulevard Bridge, SR 814 over AIWW, Pompano Beach
Commercial Boulevard Bridge, SR 870 over AIWW, Fort Lauderdale-Lauderdale-by-the-Sea
Oakland Park Boulevard Bridge, SR 816 over AIWW, Fort Lauderdale
Sunrise Boulevard Bridge, SR 838 over AIWW, Fort Lauderdale
Las Olas Boulevard Bridge, SR 842 over New River Sound (AIWW), Fort Lauderdale
17th Street Causeway, SR A1A over Stranahan River (AIWW), Fort Lauderdale
Dania Beach Boulevard Bridge, SR A1A over AIWW, Dania
Sheridan Street Bridge, SR 822 over AIWW, Hollywood
Hollywood Boulevard Bridge, SR 820 over AIWW, Hollywood
Hallandale Beach Boulevard Bridge, SR 858 over AIWW, Hallandale Beach
Sunny Isles Causeway, SR 826 over Biscayne Creek (AIWW), North Miami Beach-Sunny Isles Beach
Broad Causeway, SR 922 over Biscayne Bay (AIWW), North Miami-Bay Harbor Islands
John F. Kennedy Causeway, SR 934 over Biscayne Bay (AIWW), Miami-North Bay Village-Miami Beach
63rd Street Bridge, SR 907 over Indian Creek, Miami Beach
Venetian Causeway over Biscayne Bay (AIWW), Miami-Miami Beach

Gulf Intracoastal Waterway and tributaries
Dunedin Causeway, CR 586 over St. Joseph Sound (GIWW), Dunedin
Indian Rocks Causeway, SR 688 over The Narrows (GIWW), Indian Rocks Beach
Park Boulevard Bridge, CR 694 over The Narrows (GIWW), Indian Shores
Tom Stuart Causeway, SR 666 over Boca Ciega Bay (GIWW), Madeira Beach
John's Pass Bridge, SR 699 over Johns Pass, Madeira Beach-Treasure Island
Treasure Island Causeway, CR 150 over Boca Ciega Bay (GIWW), Treasure Island
Corey Causeway, SR 693 over Boca Ciega Bay (GIWW), St. Pete Beach
Anna Maria Island Bridge, SR 64 over Sarasota Bay (GIWW), Holmes Beach
Cortez Bridge, SR 684 over Sarasota Bay (GIWW), Bradenton Beach
Longboat Pass Bridge, SR 789 over Longboat Pass, Longboat Key
New Pass Bridge, SR 789 over New Pass, Sarasota
Siesta Key Bridge, SR 758 over Roberts Bay (GIWW), Sarasota
Stickney Point Bridge, SR 72 over Little Sarasota Bay (GIWW), Siesta Key
Blackburn Point Bridge, CR 789 over Little Sarasota Bay (GIWW), Osprey
Albee Road Bridge, CR 789 over Blackburn Bay (GIWW), Nokomis Beach
Kentucky Military Institute Bridge, US 41 Bus. over Hatchett Creek (GIWW), Venice
Venice Avenue Bridge, CR 772 over GIWW, Venice
Circus Bridge, US 41 Bus. over GIWW, Venice
Manasota Bridge, CR 774 over Lemon Bay (GIWW), Manasota Beach
Tom Adams Bridge, CR 776 over Lemon Bay (GIWW), Englewood Beach
Boca Grande Causeway, CR 771 over Gasparilla Sound (GIWW), Boca Grande
Matlacha Pass Bridge, CR 78 over Matlacha Pass, Matlacha
Big Carlos Pass Bridge, CR 865 over Big Carlos Pass, Fort Myers Beach

Okeechobee Waterway and tributaries
Old Roosevelt Bridge, CR 707 over St. Lucie River (OWW), Stuart
Point Chosen Bridge, CR 717 over Rim Canal (OWW), Belle Glade
Taylor Creek Bridge, US 98 / US 441 over Taylor Creek, Taylor Creek
LaBelle Bridge, SR 29 over Caloosahatchee River (OWW), LaBelle
Fort Denaud Bridge, CR 78A over Caloosahatchee River (OWW), Fort Denaud
Alva Bridge, CR 78 over Caloosahatchee River (OWW), Alva
Wilson Pigott Bridge, SR 31 over Caloosahatchee River (OWW), Fort Myers Shores
Billy's Creek Bridge, SR 80 westbound over Billy Creek, Fort Myers

Hillsborough River
Platt Street Bridge, Tampa
Brorein Street Bridge, Tampa
Kennedy Boulevard Bridge, SR 60, Tampa
Cass Street Bridge, Tampa
Laurel Street Bridge, Tampa
Columbus Drive Bridge, Tampa
Hillsborough Avenue Bridge, US 92, Tampa

Miami River and tributaries
Brickell Avenue Bridge, US 1, Miami
Miami Avenue Bridge, Miami
Second Avenue Bridge
First Street Bridge, SR 968 eastbound, Miami
Flagler Street Bridge, SR 968 westbound, Miami
Fifth Street Bridge, US 441, Miami
12th Avenue Bridge, SR 933, Miami
17th Avenue Bridge
22nd Avenue Bridge
27th Avenue Bridge, SR 9, Miami
Tamiami Canal Bridge, South River Drive over Tamiami Canal, Miami

New River
Third Avenue Bridge, Fort Lauderdale
Andrews Avenue Bridge, Fort Lauderdale
William H. Marshall Bridge, Southwest 4th Avenue / Southwest 7th Avenue, Fort Lauderdale
Snow-Reed Swing Bridge, Southwest 11th Avenue over North Fork, Fort Lauderdale
Davie Boulevard Bridge, SR 736 over South Fork, Fort Lauderdale
State Road 84 Bridge, SR 84 over South Fork, Fort Lauderdale

St. Johns River and tributaries
Main Street Bridge, US 1 / US 90, Jacksonville
Ortega River Bridge, SR 211 over Ortega River, Jacksonville
Astor Bridge, SR 40, Astor-Volusia
Francis P. Whitehair Bridge, SR 44, Crows Bluff

Other waterways
Beckett Bridge, Riverside Drive over Minetta Bayou, Tarpon Springs
St. Marys River Bridge, US 17 over St. Marys River, Wilds Landing
Snake Creek Bridge, US 1 over Snake Creek, Islamorada
Tarpon Dock Bridge, Beach Drive over Massalina Bayou, Panama City

See also
List of bridges on the National Register of Historic Places in Florida
List of bridges in Florida

References

National Bridge Inventory data, accessed via UglyBridges.com

Movable
Florida Movable
Bridges Movable
Bridges Movable
Florida